David Roche (born June 13, 1975) is a Canadian former ice hockey player who played in the National Hockey League for the Pittsburgh Penguins, Calgary Flames and New York Islanders between 1995 and 2001. Roche was drafted by the Penguins in the third round, 62nd overall in the 1993 NHL Entry Draft.

Minor hockey
Roche grew up in the small community of Oakwood, Ontario just west of Peterborough with his younger brother Scott, who was also an OHL player and an NHL draft choice of the St. Louis Blues. Dave grew up playing AAA hockey for the Peterborough Minor Petes system and was part of one of the top Bantam-aged teams in 1990-91.

After Bantam hockey, Roche played the 1990-91 season with the Peterborough Roadrunners Jr.B. club in the Metro Junior B. hockey league.

Roche was drafted in the 1st round (15th overall) in the 1991 OHL Priority Selection by his hometown Peterborough Petes.

Playing career
Roche played four seasons in the Ontario Hockey League prior to turning pro where he was a member of the OHL champion Peterborough Petes in 1992–93. In 1994–95 he was named an OHL First Team All-Star while a member of the Windsor Spitfires.

Roche turned pro in 1995–96, playing 71 games with the Penguins, and 61 more the following year. Unable to duplicate his junior scoring prowess, Roche soon found himself in the minor leagues until a trade to Calgary brought him back to the NHL for 36 games in 1998–99. In 2000, Roche helped lead the Saint John Flames to the Calder Cup. Roche played one game with the Islanders in 2001–02, and retired following the 2003–04 campaign.

In 2008, Roche was inducted into the Lindsay and District Sports Hall of Fame.

Roche currently lives in Ennismore, Ontario and works as a financial advisor in the Peterborough area, and coaches the Peterborough Minor Petes Midget AAA team with his brother Scott.

Career statistics

Regular season and playoffs

References

External links
 

1975 births
Living people
Albany River Rats players
Bridgeport Sound Tigers players
Calgary Flames players
Canadian ice hockey left wingers
Cincinnati Mighty Ducks players
Cleveland Lumberjacks players
Ice hockey people from Ontario
New York Islanders players
Peterborough Petes (ice hockey) players
Pittsburgh Penguins draft picks
Pittsburgh Penguins players
Saint John Flames players
Sportspeople from Kawartha Lakes
Syracuse Crunch players
Toronto Roadrunners players
Windsor Spitfires players